Diego Alexi Opazo González (born 2 February 1991) is a Chilean footballer who plays as centre-back for Primera B de Chile club Deportes Puerto Montt.

Honours
Universidad Católica
 Copa Chile: 2011

External links
 
 

1991 births
Living people
Chilean footballers
Club Deportivo Universidad Católica footballers
Deportes Concepción (Chile) footballers
San Marcos de Arica footballers
Lota Schwager footballers
Curicó Unido footballers
Rangers de Talca footballers
Deportes Santa Cruz footballers
Deportes Iberia footballers
Ñublense footballers
Association football defenders